Eglė Staišiūnaitė (born 30 September 1988 in Klaipeda) is a Lithuanian athlete who specialises in the 400 m hurdles.

Career
Staišiūnaitė competed in the 2012 European Championships in Athletics and reached 15th place in the 400 m hurdles.  She has competed for Lithuania in the Olympics (2012) and World Championships (2015).

Achievements

References

External links 
 

1988 births
Living people
Sportspeople from Panevėžys
Lithuanian female hurdlers
University of Wisconsin–Milwaukee alumni
Olympic athletes of Lithuania
Athletes (track and field) at the 2012 Summer Olympics
World Athletics Championships athletes for Lithuania